Konstantinos Panagou (born 11 June 1998) is a Greek professional footballer who plays as a right-back for Super League 2 club Iraklis.

References

1998 births
Living people
Greece youth international footballers
Greek expatriate footballers
Super League Greece players
English Football League players
Football League (Greece) players
Super League Greece 2 players
Olympiacos F.C. players
Nottingham Forest F.C. players
Kalamata F.C. players
Iraklis Thessaloniki F.C. players
Greek expatriate sportspeople in England
Expatriate footballers in England
Association football defenders
Footballers from Athens
Greek footballers